Yurmaty (Yurmatı) is a rural locality (a selo) and the administrative centre of Pugachevsky Selsoviet, Fyodorovsky District, Bashkortostan, Russia. The population was 749 as of 2010. There are 7 streets.

Geography 
Yurmaty is located 49 km southeast of Fyodorovka (the district's administrative centre) by road. Bogorodskoye is the nearest rural locality.

References 

Rural localities in Fyodorovsky District